Scott Benton may refer to:

Scott Benton (politician) (born 1987), British politician
Scott Benton (rugby union) (born 1974), English former rugby union footballer